This is a list of properties and historic districts in the U.S. state of South Dakota that are listed on the National Register of Historic Places. The state's more than 1,300 listings are distributed across all of its 66 counties.

The locations of National Register properties and districts (at least for all showing latitude and longitude coordinates below), may be seen in an online map by clicking on "Map of all coordinates".

The following are approximate tallies of current listings by county.

Current listings by county

See also

List of National Historic Landmarks in South Dakota
List of bridges on the National Register of Historic Places in South Dakota

References

 
South Dakota